Wola Lipecka  is a village in the administrative district of Gmina Orneta, within Lidzbark County, Warmian-Masurian Voivodeship, in northern Poland.

The village has a population of 100.

References

Wola Lipecka